Ferry Point, also known as Austin, is an area located on the west of Jordan, Kowloon, Hong Kong. It was at the seafront and adjacent to former Jordan Road Ferry Pier. However, after reclamation, the ferry pier was then demolished and the name Austin is frequently used instead of Ferry Point.

Ferry Point is often considered as the area at the west of Jordan and Kwun Chung, the south of Tai Kok Tsui and the east of Elements (a mall above Kowloon station of the MTR Airport Express and Tung Chung line).

History

References

Yau Ma Tei